The Republican Party of India (Athawale) is a political party in India. The party is a splinter group of the Republican Party of India and has its roots in the Scheduled Castes Federation led by B. R. Ambedkar. The president of the party is Ramdas Athawale.

History
Ramdas Athawale was a member of the Maharashtra Legislative Council from 1990 to 1995 and a cabinet member in the Government of Maharashtra. Subsequently, he was elected to the Parliament of India, representing Mumbai North Central in the 12th Lok Sabha between 1998–99 and the Pandharpur constituency from 1999 to 2004. After the 2004 election, it had a small representation in the Lok Sabha and was a constituent of the ruling United Progressive Alliance. Its presence is limited to Maharashtra.

All factions of the RPI except Prakash Ambedkar's Bharipa Bahujan Mahasangh have reunited to form a Republican Party of India (United).

In 2011, the party aligned itself with the Bharatiya Janata Party-led National Democratic Alliance.

Rakhi Sawant resigned from Rashtriya Aam Party and joined Republican Party of India (A) in June 2014 and expressed her desire to work for dalits. Rakhi serves as party's state vice-president and president of woman wing.

In September 2015, the RPI(A) was one of 16 parties in Maharashtra to lose its registration for not submitting audited balance sheets and IT return documents since 2005. Thus they have lost their official election symbols.

Athawale is only member in Member of Parliament in Upper House of the Indian parliament. He is currently Minister of State for Social Justice and Empowerment Department with Disability Affairs from July 2016 in Narendra Modi ministry.

In May 2019, Athawale continued his position as Minister of State for Social Justice and Empowerment.

See also
 Politics of India
 List of political parties in India
 National Democratic Alliance
 Dalit

References

Political schisms
Republican Party of India
 
Political parties in Maharashtra
Ambedkarite political parties
Secularist organizations
Socialist parties in India
Political parties established in 1999
1999 establishments in Maharashtra